Phyllophaga floridana is a species of scarab beetle in the family Scarabaeidae. It is found in North America, and most commonly in the peninsula of Florida and similar humid climates.

References

Further reading

 

Melolonthinae
Articles created by Qbugbot
Beetles described in 1938